Men's freestyle 55 kg competition at the 2010 Commonwealth Games in New Delhi, India, was held on 10 October at the Indira Gandhi Arena.

Medalists

Bracket

Repechage

References 

Wrestling at the 2010 Commonwealth Games